Gonioteuthis (meaning narrow squid or slim squid) is a genus of belemnite, an extinct group of cephalopods. It grew to a body length (excluding tentacles) of 8 inches (20 centimeters) and fed on small marine animals. Fossils of Gonioteuthis have been found in the Netherlands, Germany, and Sweden in rocks dated to the late Cretaceous Period, specifically 85 to 70 million years ago.

See also

 Belemnite
 List of belemnites

References
 Parker, Steve. Dinosaurus: the complete guide to dinosaurs. Firefly Books Inc, 2003. Pg. 49
 Fossilworks. "Gonioteuthis (belemnite)". http://www.fossilworks.org/cgi-bin/bridge.pl?a=taxonInfo&taxon_no=15866.

Belemnites